Pascal Dobert (born April 8, 1974) is an American steeplechase runner.

He finished seventh at the 1998 IAAF World Cup and competed at the 1999 World Championships and the 2000 Summer Olympics without reaching the final. Dobert was born in Washington, D.C.

His personal best time was 8:15.77 minutes, achieved in July 2000 in Sacramento.

As of 2018, he is the assistant coach to Jerry Schumacher for the Bowerman Track Club.

References

1973 births
Living people
American male steeplechase runners
Olympic track and field athletes of the United States
Athletes (track and field) at the 2000 Summer Olympics
Track and field athletes from Washington, D.C.
World Athletics Championships athletes for the United States
20th-century American people
21st-century American people